Nepal Airlines Flight 555 was a short domestic scheduled flight from Pokhara Airport to Jomsom Airport in Nepal of about 20 minutes' flying time, operated by Nepal Airlines. On 16 May 2013 the de Havilland Canada DHC-6 Twin Otter aircraft operating the flight crashed while landing at Jomsom Airport. Seven of the twenty-one on board were seriously injured. There were no fatalities, but the aircraft was damaged beyond economic repair.

Aircraft
The aircraft involved was a de Havilland Canada DHC-6 Twin Otter bearing the registration 9N-ABO. It was built in 1979 and was operated by Nepal Airlines ever since. Following this incident, the aircraft was written off.

Passengers

There were eight Japanese tourists on the flight. All sustained injuries, with four of them in a critical condition according to a police officer.

Investigation
An investigation will be carried out to determine what caused the accident. According to an official at Tribhuvan International Airport, preliminary reports have shown that windy conditions could have played a part in the crash.

According to police, just after the aircraft touched down on the runway it veered towards the right and fell  down the bank of the Gandaki River. The forward fuselage was destroyed, but the rear of the aircraft remained intact. The left wing was found submerged in the river.

Aftermath
The accident left Nepal Airlines with only two operational aircraft for its domestic flights. The airline said that it planned an engine exchange that would put three more Twin Otters, currently grounded, back in the air, but that process would take at least five months.  In the meantime, the airline was expect to suffer a significant loss of market share.

Contrary to common practices in aviation, Nepal Airlines did not retire the flight number 555 and still operates the flight from Pokhara to Jomsom under this number.

References

Aviation accidents and incidents in 2013
Aviation accidents and incidents in Nepal
2013 in Nepal
March 2013 events in Asia
Accidents and incidents involving the de Havilland Canada DHC-6 Twin Otter
Nepal Airlines accidents and incidents
2013 disasters in Nepal